Sarah Bentley (born 8 March 1973) is a British former professional tennis player.

Bentley qualified for her first WTA Tour tournament at Brighton in 1989 and reached a best singles ranking of No. 269 on the professional tour.

As a wildcard, Bentley twice featured in the main draw at Wimbledon. In 1991 she lost a three set opening round match to Maya Kidowaki, then in 1992 was beaten in the first round by seventh seed Mary Joe Fernandez.

ITF finals

Singles (1–2)

References

External links
 
 

1973 births
Living people
British female tennis players
English female tennis players